Ragnvald Berg (September 23, 1879 – September 15, 1950) was an American gymnast. He competed in three events at the 1904 Summer Olympics.

References

External links
 

1879 births
1950 deaths
American male artistic gymnasts
Olympic gymnasts of the United States
Athletes (track and field) at the 1904 Summer Olympics
Gymnasts at the 1904 Summer Olympics
Sportspeople from Oslo
Norwegian emigrants to the United States